For Better, for Worse is a 1954 British comedy film in Eastmancolor directed by J. Lee Thompson and starring Dirk Bogarde, Susan Stephen and Cecil Parker. It was based on Arthur Watkyn's play of the same title which had run for over 500 performances in the West End starring Leslie Phillips and Geraldine McEwan. It was released in the United States as Cocktails in the Kitchen.

Plot
A young couple – Tony and Anne (Dirk Bogarde and Susan Stephen) decide to get married, however Tony does not have the required prospects that her father (Cecil Parker) insists on, so he sets his future son-in-law some conditions before allowing the wedding.

Cast

 Dirk Bogarde as Tony Howard 
 Susan Stephen as Anne Purves 
 Cecil Parker as Anne's Father 
 Eileen Herlie as Anne's Mother 
 Athene Seyler as Miss Mainbrace 
 Dennis Price as Debenham 
 Pia Terri as Mrs. Debenham 
 James Hayter as the Plumber 
 Thora Hird as Mrs. Doyle 
 George Woodbridge as Alf 
 Charles Victor as Fred 
 Sid James as the Foreman 
 Peter Jones as the Car Salesman 
 Edwin Styles as Anne's Boss
 Mary Law as Girl in Office.
 Leonard Sharp as 	First Workman
 Dennis Wyndham as 	Second Workman
 Robin Bailey as Store Salesman
 Digby Wolfe as 	Grocer's Assistant
 Geoffrey Hibbert as Butcher's Assistant
 Ronnie Stevens as Fishmonger's Assistant
 Jackie Collins as 	Glamour Girl

Production
The film was based on a play by Arthur Watkins, a censor for the British film board who wrote plays under a pen name Arthur Watkyn. The play debuted in London in December 1952 with a cast including Leslie Philips, Dandy Nichols and Geraldine McEwan. Reviews called it "agreeable". It was a huge success, running for over 500 performances. The play was performed on radio and television.

Film rights were purchased by Associated British. Susan Stephens had just been in His Excellency at Ealing Studios. It was the first role for Pia Terri from Italy.

Filming took place at Elstree Studios, starting 1 March 1954. It was the first film shot there to use Eastman colour. The film's sets were designed by the art director Michael Stringer.

Reception

Box Office
The film was successful at the box office in Britain, helped in part by the fact Dirk Bogarde had just been seen in Doctor in the House. According to Kinematograph Weekly the film was a "money maker" at the British box office in 1954.

Critical reception
The Monthly Film Bulletin said "there is nothing very original... but it is played with charm and veracity."

Sky Movies noted "Arthur Watkyn's famous stage success has proved successful material for drama societies up and down the land – but still comes up like new in this bright little film version...Warm, human and charmingly funny domestic comedy, dressed up as fresh as paint by the colour camerawork."

References

External links

For Better For Worse at Letterbox DVD

Films directed by J. Lee Thompson
1954 films
Films shot at Associated British Studios
British comedy films
1954 comedy films
Films with screenplays by J. Lee Thompson
British films based on plays
Films about marriage
Films set in London
Films shot in London
1950s English-language films
1950s British films